Jübar is a municipality in the district Altmarkkreis Salzwedel, in Saxony-Anhalt, Germany. Since 1 January 2010 it has incorporated the former municipalities of Bornsen, Hanum, Lüdelsen and Nettgau.

References

Municipalities in Saxony-Anhalt
Altmarkkreis Salzwedel